Imogen Lee Claire (2 November 1943 – 24 June 2005), born Crowe, was a British dancer, choreographer, actress, and dance teacher.

Early life
Born in London in 1943, Claire was the daughter of Antony Lee Crowe and Kathleen Eden-Green, who had married in 1938. Her mother was a schoolmistress, and her father was a graduate student working on a thesis. She was educated at the Royal Ballet School and the London Dance Theatre. In the autumn of 1961, the Dancing Times reported Imogen Crowe as a notable Royal Ballet School leaver who had passed her Advanced Royal Academy of Dance exams with a commendation. Claire’s grandmother, Evelyn Eden-Green, died in 1965.

Career
As a dancer, Claire gained leading roles in the 1960s. In the winter of 1963, as Imogen Crowe, she appeared as Terpsichore in the first English production of the Stravinsky ballet Apollo, choreographed by Balanchine, opposite Maximo Barra as Apollo. This opened at the Royalty Theatre, Chester, on 9 November and then went on tour. 

In 1970, Claire played Lucretia Borgia on stage in The Council of Love, with Warren Mitchell as Satan. Ken Russell then recruited her for minor roles in his avant garde films, beginning with three in 1971, The Music Lovers, The Devils, and The Boy Friend. She continued to appear in many of Russell’s films, and as well as having a part in his The Lair of the White Worm (1988) she was the film’s choreographer.

In the theatre Claire worked several times  with Philip Prowse, as an actor, dancer, and choreographer. Her last film was Billy Elliot (2000), in which she played a dance examiner.

Claire taught for two years at the Drama Centre London. In 1994, she was the first choreographer elected to the council of the union Equity and originated several dance initiatives, including the Dance Passport (2000) and new insurance plans for dancers. She was elected for the last time in 2004, but a long battle with cancer intervened in her many activities and she died in Westminster on 24 June 2005. At the time of her death, she was living in Linden Gardens, off Notting Hill Gate, Kensington.

Personal life
In 1977, while appearing as a Cabaret Girl in a revival of Tales from the Vienna Woods at the National Theatre, Claire met John Rothenberg, a stage manager. They lived together through the 1980s and were married in 1992. Rothenberg, who was some fifteen years older than Claire, died in 2004.

Films
 The Music Lovers (1971) as Lady in White 
 The Devils (1971) as Nun 
 The Boy Friend (1971) as dancer 
 Savage Messiah (1972), as Mavis Coldstream
 Henry VIII and His Six Wives (1972) as Maria de Salinas 
 Mahler (1974)
 Tommy (1975) as Specialist’s Nurse 
 Lisztomania (1975) as George Sand
 The Rocky Horror Picture Show (1975) as Transylvanian 
 Valentino (1977)
 Hussy (1980) as Imogen 
 Flash Gordon (1980) as Special Movement 
 Caravaggio (1986) as Lady with the Jewels
 The Lair of the White Worm (1988) as Dorothy Trent 
 Salome's Last Dance (1988) as Second Nazarean 
 Prisoner of Honor (1991) as cabaret singer 
 Hotel Splendide (2000) as Edna Blanche 
 Billy Elliot (2000) as dance examiner

Television
Star Maidens (1976) as Doctor
 Clouds of Glory (1978) as Spectre

Notes

External links
Imogen Claire at IMDb
Imogen Claire (1943-2005, at National Portrait Gallery, London
Imogen Claire at British Film Institute

1943 births
2005 deaths
Academics of the Drama Centre London
English choreographers
People educated at the Royal Ballet School